"Do You Know Squarepusher" is a track by Squarepusher from the 2002 album Do You Know Squarepusher. The track was originally released as an untitled single in 2001. The only writing that appears on the release is "Squarepusher"; however, the only song which appears on the release is the track later renamed "Do You Know Squarepusher". The single is a 12" vinyl and is a single-sided pressing.

The single was selected as NMEs "Single of the Week" in its week of release. It also received a very positive review at Drowned in Sound, where it received a 10/10 rating.

Track listing
Side A
"Do You Know Squarepusher" – 4:55
Side B
Side B is intentionally left blank

References

External links
Discogs entry

2001 songs
2001 singles
Squarepusher songs
Warp (record label) singles